Chaos and Creation in the Backyard is the thirteenth solo studio album by Paul McCartney, released on 12 and 13 September, 2005. Some 18 months in the making, the album was produced by Radiohead and Beck collaborator Nigel Godrich at George Martin's suggestion.

McCartney plays almost all of the instruments, similar to his 1970 album McCartney, the 1980 McCartney II album and the 2020 McCartney III album. In addition, Chaos and Creation in the Backyard marks the first time since 1984's Give My Regards to Broad Street that McCartney was not credited as producer or co-producer of one of his studio albums.

Chaos and Creation in the Backyard was McCartney's last rock album release for longtime label EMI. He signed a deal with Hear Music, owned by Starbucks, in March 2007. He later returned to his old label Capitol Records in 2016.

Music and lyrics
McCartney said that the song "Friends to Go" is influenced by, and dedicated to, George Harrison.

Production
Upon being asked to produce an album with McCartney, Godrich admitted:

"My initial reaction was one of terror, not only because it's a very important person, but I really wasn't sure how willing he would be to get his hands dirty."

The two tentatively began a collaboration, recording the songs "This Never Happened Before" and "Follow Me" which was enough to convince both of them that they could develop an album. Godrich's participation was active: he inspired McCartney to write the song "At the Mercy", added piano loops on "How Kind of You" and worked with McCartney to slow the tempo of "Riding to Vanity Fair" which McCartney says "changed the mood completely". Although initially taken aback, McCartney appreciated Godrich's tenacity and honesty.

According to McCartney, Godrich was at times blunt in his appraisal of McCartney's songs-in-progress during the making of Chaos and Creation in the Backyard:
"Nigel... refused to allow me to sing songs that he didn't like, which was very cheeky of him."

Recording
Recording sessions for the album covered a period of some 18 months, with many pauses. First sessions were held at RAK Studios, London in September 2003 by McCartney and his band. After a few takes, Godrich said to McCartney he wanted to work with him alone, not involving the band. After some months' break, sessions resumed at Ocean Way Studios, Los Angeles in April 2004, with more sessions in September. Final recordings took place at AIR Studios, London in April 2005.

Artwork
The cover for Chaos and Creation in the Backyard is from a photograph of McCartney strumming a guitar in his family's back yard in Liverpool, taken by his brother Mike McCartney (aka Mike McGear) and originally titled Paul Under Washing, before being retitled Our Kid Through Mum's Net Curtains.

Release and promotion
The first single, the upbeat "Fine Line", was released in late August 2005, ahead of the release of Chaos and Creation in the Backyard, and reached No. 20 in the UK. A second single, "Jenny Wren", reached No. 22 in the UK that November. "Fine Line" and "Jenny Wren" appeared on singles with their running time shortened. The singles also included five non-album b-sides: "Comfort of Love", "Growing Up Falling Down" ("Fine Line"), "Summer of '59" (vinyl edition of "Jenny Wren"), "This Loving Game" and "I Want You to Fly" (CD edition of "Jenny Wren").

The Japanese CD release of the album included the song "She Is So Beautiful". The song was also offered as a free download in Windows Media Audio format to US customers who purchased the CD at Target stores. Other bonus downloadable songs were made available to people who bought the CD at certain other stores, such as Best Buy and Wal-Mart.

The 'US' Tour in 2005 helped to promote the album in the US and Canada.

There was also a promotional concert for the album held at Abbey Road Studios, called Chaos and Creation at Abbey Road. During the show McCartney played acoustic versions of various songs, demonstrated some instruments and told stories. At the end he and the audience recorded a short track together.

The album was reissued in 2018 on vinyl in black and gold editions.

Reception

At Metacritic, the album holds an average Metascore of 78 out of 100, based on 19 reviews, which indicates a generally favourable reception. Advance reviews for Chaos and Creation in the Backyard suggested that after delivering Flaming Pie, Run Devil Run, Driving Rain and this album – all in uninterrupted succession – McCartney was in a late-career creative peak. Many critics and longtime listeners also considered that the album was unusually reflective and intimate-sounding for McCartney. The sudden shift in direction was generally considered an unexpected and welcome surprise, and resulted in four Grammy nominations for the album, including the nomination for Album of the Year.

Reviewing for the BBC, Daryl Easlea described Chaos and Creation as "Very, very good", and added: Riding to Vanity Fair', 'Too Much Rain', 'Anyway' and 'How Kind of You' are full of subtle nuances, killer hooks and sweet surprises. They really do rank among his very best work." In The New York Times, Jon Pareles wrote that McCartney's return to a multi-instrumentalist role "makes the songs more intimate and less conventional", while remarking of the project: "Sir Paul chose a producer who favored the experimental side: Nigel Godrich … Sir Paul also lined up his best backup band since the Beatles: himself."

In the US, Chaos and Creation in the Backyard debuted at the No. 6 on the Billboard 200 with sales of 91,545 copies. It stayed on chart for a total of 21 weeks, selling over 530,000 copies up to 2007. However, the album underperformed in the UK, peaking at the No. 10 and spending only three weeks inside the top 200, with cumulative sales of around 45,000 units. According to the annual report published by EMI, Chaos and Creation in the Backyard had sold 1.3 million copies worldwide by the end of March 2006.

Track listing

Special edition DVD

"Between Chaos and Creation" – Documentary (30 mins)
"Fine Line" – Studio Performance Video (4 mins)
"Line Art" – 12 Minute Animated Film – drawings by the artist Brian Clarke. Animation by Momoco. (Includes 3 instrumental tracks: "Riding To Vanity Fair", "At the Mercy" and "Anyway").
"How Kind of You" – DVD Menu (5 mins)

Executive producer: Paul McCartney
Director and editor: Simon Hilton
Producer: James Chads
Production company: Maguffin
DVD mastering: Abbey Road Interactive

Personnel
Personnel per booklet.

Musicians
 Paul McCartney – piano, electric piano, Baldwin spinet, bass guitar, electric guitar, acoustic guitar, classical guitar, drums, drum machine, violin, maracas, tambourine, vocals, flugelhorn, güiro, acoustic guitar loops, cello, vibrachimes, B3 organ, tambourine on snare, melodica, recorders, tubular bells, 12 string guitar, autoharp, harmonium, gong, triangle, toy glockenspiel, percussion, woodblock, moog synthesizer
 Millennia Ensemble – strings, brass instrument
 Joby Talbot – string arrangement, conducting, brass arrangement
 Nigel Godrich – piano and Epiphone acoustic guitar loops
 Pedro Eustache – duduk
 Jason Falkner – electric guitar, classical guitar
 James Gadson – drums
 Joey Waronker – bass drum, bongos, shaker

 The Los Angeles Music Players – strings
 David Campbell – string arrangement
 Rusty Anderson – acoustic guitar
 Brian Ray – acoustic guitar
 Abe Laboriel Jr. – percussion, block, tambourine

Production
 Nigel Godrich – producer
 Dan Grech-Marguerat – production assistant
 Darrell Thorp – engineer
 Alan Yoshida – mastering
 Mike McCartney – cover
 Brian Clarke – inlay
 Bill Bernstein – back cover
 Paul McCartney, Stylorouge London – art direction

Session information
Recording dates per The Paul McCartney Project

Fine Line
Recorded – Air Studios, London, September 2004
Paul McCartney – Vocals, Bösendorfer Grand Piano, Baldwin Spinet, Höfner Bass Guitar, Epiphone Casino Electric Guitar, Martin D28 Acoustic Guitar, Ludwig Drums, Shakers, Tambourine
Millennia Ensemble – Strings
Joby Talbot – Conducting, Arrangement

How Kind of You
Recorded – Air Studios, London, April 2005
Paul McCartney – Vocals, Epiphone Casino Electric Guitar, Martin D28 Acoustic Guitar, Höfner Bass Guitar, Bösendorfer Grand Piano, Flugelhorn, Shaker, Guerrero, Ludwig Drums, Piano and Epiphone Acoustic Guitar Loops
Nigel Godrich – Piano and Epiphone Acoustic Guitar Loops

Jenny Wren
Recorded – Ocean Way Recording, L.A., October 2004
Paul McCartney – Vocals, Epiphone Texan Acoustic Guitar, Ludwig Floor Tom
Pedro Eustache – Duduk

At the Mercy
Recorded – Ocean Way Recording, L.A., Air Studios, London, April and September 2004
Paul McCartney – Vocals, Steinway Grand Piano, Fender Telecaster Electric Guitar, Höfner Bass Guitar, Cello, Mass Vibrachimes, Tambourine, B3 Organ
Jason Falkner – Electric Guitar
James Gadson – Drums
Millennia Ensemble – Strings, Brass
Joby Talbot – Conducting, Arrangement

Friends to Go
Recorded – Air Studios, London, April 2005
Paul McCartney – Vocals, Bösendorfer Grand Piano, Martin D28 Acoustic Guitar, Höfner Bass Guitar, Epiphone Casino Electric Guitar, Ludwig Drums, Tambourine on Snare, Flugelhorn, Hohner Melodica, Shakers

English Tea
Recorded – Ocean Way Recording, L.A., Air Studios, London, April 2005
Paul McCartney – Vocals, Bösendorfer Grand Piano, Höfner Bass Guitar, Ludwig Bass Drum, Recorders, Tubular Bells
Millennia Ensemble – Strings, Brass
Joby Talbot – Conducting, Arrangement

Too Much Rain
Recorded – Air Studios, London, September 2004
Paul McCartney – Vocals, Bösendorfer Grand Piano, Fender Stratocaster Electric Guitar, Martin D28 Acoustic Guitar, Martin 12-String Guitar, Höfner Bass Guitar, Epiphone Casino Electric Guitar, Schmidt Autoharp, Ludwig Drums, Maracas

A Certain Softness
Recorded – Ocean Way Recording, L.A., April 2004
Paul McCartney – Vocal, Petersen Classical Guitar, Höfner Bass Guitar, Crown Upright Piano, Harmonium, Paiste Gong, Cymbal, Triangle
Jason Falkner – Classical Guitar
Joey Waronker – Bass Drum, Bongo Drums, Shaker

Riding to Vanity Fair
Recorded – Ocean Way Recording, L.A., Spring, 2004, and Air Studios, London, Late 2004 – April 2005
Paul McCartney – Vocals, Höfner Bass Guitar, Epiphone Casino Electric Guitar, Martin D28 Acoustic Guitar, Toy Glockenspiel, Wurlitzer Electric Piano
Los Angeles Music Players – Strings
David Campbell – Arrangement
James Gadson – Drums

Follow Me
Recorded – RAK Studios, London, September 2003 and April 2005 (overdubs)
Paul McCartney – Vocals, Höfner Bass Guitar, Epiphone Casino Electric Guitar, Epiphone Texan Acoustic Guitar, Ludwig Drums, Percussion, Block, Tambourine
Rusty Anderson – Acoustic Guitar
Brian Ray – Acoustic Guitar
Abe Laboriel Jnr – Percussion, Block, Tambourine
Millennia Ensemble – Strings
Joby Talbot – Conducting, Arrangement

Promise to You Girl
Recorded – Ocean Way Recording, L.A., November 2004
Paul McCartney – Vocals, Crown Upright Piano, Steinway Grand Piano, Höfner Bass Guitar, Epiphone Casino Electric Guitar, Ludwig Drums, Moog Synthesizer, Tambourine, Triangle, Shaker

This Never Happened Before
Recorded – RAK Studios, London, September 2003 and April 2005 (overdubs)
Paul McCartney – Vocals, Yamaha Grand Piano, Höfner Bass Guitar, Epiphone Casino Electric Guitar, Ludwig Drums, Drum Machine
Millennia Ensemble – Strings, Brass
Joby Talbot – Conducting, Arrangement

Anyway
Recorded – Ocean Way Recording, L.A., Air Studios, London, November 2004 and April 2005 (overdubs)
Paul McCartney – Vocals, Steinway Grand Piano, Höfner Bass Guitar, Gibson L5 Electric Guitar, Martin D28 Acoustic Guitar, Ludwig Drums, Moog Synthesizer, Harmonium
Millennia Ensemble – Strings, Brass
Joby Talbot – Conducting, Arrangement

Accolades

Grammy Awards 

|-
|  style="width:35px; text-align:center;" rowspan="4"|2006 || rowspan="2"|Chaos and Creation in the Backyard || Album of the Year || 
|-
| Best Pop Vocal Album || 
|-
|"Fine Line" || Best Male Pop Vocal Performance || 
|-
| Nigel Godrich || Non-Classical Producer of the Year || 
|-
| style="text-align:center;"|2007 || "Jenny Wren" || Best Male Pop Vocal Performance || 
|-

Charts

Weekly charts

Year-end charts

Certifications and sales

References

External links

2005 albums
Paul McCartney albums
Parlophone albums
Albums arranged by David Campbell (composer)
Albums produced by Nigel Godrich
Albums recorded at RAK Studios
Albums recorded at United Western Recorders
Albums recorded at AIR Studios